The Admiralty Navy War Council  was a temporary war planning and naval strategy advising committee of the Admiralty established in October, 1909 under Admiral Fisher it existed until 1911 when it was later replaced by the Admiralty War Staff.

History
In May 1909, the Director of Naval Intelligence, Rear-Admiral Alexander E. Bethell, submitted a written report for the creation of a "Navy War Council" following the outcome of the Beresford Inquiry and recommendations that followed; it was to be made up of the following personnel: the First Sea Lord as president; the Director of Naval Intelligence acting as vice-president; an "Assistant Director for War"; the President, and the Captain of the Royal Naval War College; the Naval Assistant to the First Sea Lord. The head of the War Division of the Naval Intelligence Department's  and the Commander of the Royal Naval War College acting as Joint Secretaries. Other Admiralty department heads could be summoned, to act as members of the council as and when their expertise was required. Its role acted as a precursor to the establishment of a professional naval staff function; it would initially devise on naval war plans, and also given an advisory role on naval strategy matters 
The council held a series of nine meetings between 13 October 1909 and 10 June 1911  before it was abolished and replaced by the Admiralty War Staff in January 1912.

Council members
The Council had of four members, including 
 First Sea Lord, and President of the War Council and Chief of Staff.
 Director of Naval Intelligence.
 Director of Naval Mobilisation.
 Secretary of the Navy War Council who was the Assistant Secretary to the Admiralty.

References

Attribution
Primary source for this article is by *Harley, Simon and Lovell, Tony (2015).Navy War Council, dreadnoughtproject.org, Harley and Lovell.

Sources
 Grimes, S. (2012). Probes into Admiralty War Planning, 1908–9. In Strategy and War Planning in the British Navy, 1887-1918, Boydell and Brewer, . 
 Harley Simon, Lovell Tony, (2017), Navy War Council, dreadnoughtproject.org, http://www.dreadnoughtproject.org.

External links

Royal Navy
Royal Navy appointments
1909 establishments in the United Kingdom
1911 disestablishments in the United Kingdom